Tamanak-e Olya (also Romanized as Tamānak-e ‘Olyā; also known as Tūmanak-e Bālā, Tūmānak-e ‘Olyā, and Tūmanak-e ‘Olyā) is a village in Sepidar Rural District, in the Central District of Boyer-Ahmad County, Kohgiluyeh and Boyer-Ahmad Province, Iran. At the 2006 census, its population was 35, in 7 families.

References 

Populated places in Boyer-Ahmad County